Basij Metro Station is an urban rail station of the Mashhad Metro, Line 1, opened on 10 October 2011 and located on Basij Square. The station is also planned to serve Line 3 of the Mashhad Metro and provide an interchange between the two lines once construction of the second line is completed. The station has a connection to the BRT line, providing access to the Mashhad Passenger Terminal and Imam Reza shrine.

References

Mashhad Metro stations
Railway stations opened in 2011
2011 establishments in Iran